Naël Wellofsky Élysée (born 28 May 2001) is a Haitian professional footballer who plays as a forward for Municipal Grecia.

Career

For the 2018 season, Élysée signed for Haitian top flight side Don Bosco from Port-de-Paix in the second division.

In 2020, he signed for Costa Rican club Municipal Grecia.

References

External links
 Naël Élysée at Footballdatabase.eu

Haitian footballers
Living people
Association football forwards
2001 births
People from Nord-Ouest (department)
C.S. Herediano footballers
Don Bosco FC players
Municipal Grecia players
Haitian expatriate footballers
Haitian expatriate sportspeople in Costa Rica
Expatriate footballers in Costa Rica
Haiti under-20 international footballers